The International Journal of Theoretical Physics is a peer-reviewed scientific journal of physics published by Springer Science+Business Media since 1968. According to the Journal Citation Reports, the journal has a 2020 impact factor of 1.708  and publishes both original research and review articles. The editor-in-chief is Heinrich Saller (Max Planck Institute for Physics).

Scope and indexing 
The journal covers the following areas: general relativity, quantum theory with relativistic quantum field theory, quantum measurement theory, quantum geometry and quantum logic. Services abstracting and indexing this journal include Chemical Abstracts Service, Mathematical Reviews, Science Citation Index, Scopus, and Zentralblatt MATH.

References 

Physics journals
Springer Science+Business Media academic journals
Publications established in 1968
Monthly journals
English-language journals